Pabumath is an Indus Valley civilisation archaeological site near Suvai village in Rapar Taluka of Kutch district, Gujarat, India.

Excavation
Archaeological Survey of India has undertaken excavation at this location during 1977–78,1978–79,1980-81.

Findings
A large building complex, unicorn seal, shell bangles, beads, copper bangles, needles, antimony rods, steatite micro beads; pottery include large and medium size jars, beaker, dishes, dish-on-stand, perforated jars etc.; fine red pottery with black painted designs etc. were found during 1980-81 excavations. Animal remains of cattle, buffalo, fish, sheep, wild pig and rabbit were also found.

Other observations
This site is in Kutch district, where several other IVC sites such as Dholavira, Desalpur, Surkotada etc. are located. Evidence of fortification was found at this site as well as at Desalpur, Netra-Khissar, Surkotada, Dholavira, Kotada, Meghpar, Sevakia, Chitrod, Kanmer etc.  which are nearby IVC sites.

See also

 List of Indus Valley Civilization sites
Shikarpur, Gujarat
Kerala-no-dhoro
Desalpur
Babar Kot

External links
Location of Indus Valley Civilisation sites near Pabumath

References

Indus Valley civilisation sites
Archaeological sites in Gujarat
Former populated places in India
Kutch district